Sarah Gill may refer to:

 Sarah Gill (rugby union) (born 1983), Scottish rugby union player
 Sarah Prince Gill (1728–1761), American Christian prayer group leader and writer
 Sarah Ann Gill (1795–1866), social and religious leader in Barbados